The 1982 FA Charity Shield was a football match between Liverpool and Tottenham Hotspur at Wembley on 21 August 1982.
Liverpool, managed by Bob Paisley had won the 1981–82 Football League, and Tottenham, managed by Keith Burkinshaw had won the 1982 FA Cup Final for the second season in a row. In doing so the teams qualified for the season opener which was played the week before the new league season kicked off.
Ian Rush scored the only goal in the thirty-second minute to win the trophy for a ninth time for Liverpool.

Match details

See also
1981–82 Football League
1981–82 FA Cup

References

1982
Charity Shield 1982
Charity Shield 1982
Comm
FA Charity Shield